The Moerman Therapy, also called Moerman Method or Moerman Diet is a purported cancer treatment from the Dutch practitioner  (1893–1988). Its effectiveness is supported by anecdote only – there is no evidence of its worth as a cancer treatment.

History

Moerman who experimented with pigeons in the 1930s argued that he had identified "mysterious suppressors" of the cancer cell and there are "eight
essential substances" that maintain human health. He claimed that deficiency of these substances leads to metabolic disturbances and anomalies of regeneration tissue that enable microorganisms which he termed "symbionts" to convert healthy cells into cancer cells.

According to Quackwatch the Moerman diet is a lacto-vegetarian diet that "prohibited all meats, all fish and shellfish, alcohol, animal fats, artificial colorings, beans, peas, lentils, mushrooms, potatoes, red cabbage, cheeses with high fat and salt content,  and other hydrogenated oils, coffee, cocoa or  teas, egg whites, sugar, salt, white flour, and tobacco." The alleged "symbionts" that Moerman proposed have never been shown to exist.

In 2000, Moerman's invention of the diet earned him a place at the head of "a list of the twenty biggest quacks of the twentieth century" as decided by the Dutch Union Against Quackery.

See also
List of ineffective cancer treatments

References 

Alternative cancer treatments
Pseudoscience